Kent E. Calder (born April 18, 1948) is the Interim Dean of the Johns Hopkins School of Advanced International Studies (SAIS). He serves as the Director of the Edwin O. Reischauer Center for East Asian Studies, and is also the Edwin O. Reischauer Professor of East Asian Studies at SAIS. He previously served as the Vice Dean for Faculty Affairs and International Research Cooperation at the Paul H. Nitze School of Advanced International Studies (SAIS), Johns Hopkins University.

Calder is the author of 15 major books and numerous scholarly and popular articles. Crisis and Compensation (1988) received the Ohira Memorial Prize and the Arisawa Memorial Prize of the American Association of University Publishers. Pacific Defense (1996) was the first publication by an American to receive the Mainichi Grand Prix in Asia-Pacific Studies (1997) for its analysis of how economic change is transforming the U.S.-East Asia security equation.Super Continent: The Logic of Eurasian Integration was published in 2019. His works have been translated into five foreign languages, including Japanese, Korean, Chinese, Portuguese, and Mongolian. His book "Super Continent" received two awards: "Financial Times Book of the Year in Politics" for 2019; and the "Okakura Tenshin International Prize in Eurasian Studies" for 2020.

History
Calder served from 1997 to 2001 as special advisor to the U.S. Ambassador to Japan, working under Walter Mondale, Thomas Foley, and briefly Howard Baker. He has also held staff positions with the U.S. Congress and the Federal Trade Commission, serving as a member of the Council on Foreign Relations since 1990. Calder joined Johns Hopkins SAIS in 2003, serving as director of the Reischauer Center for East Asian Studies (2003–present); Asia Programs (2016-2018); and as Vice Dean (2018-2020).

Calder taught for two decades at Princeton University (1983 -2003), where he holds emeritus standing, after teaching for four years at Harvard University, where he earned his Ph.D. At Harvard, he was the first Executive Director of the university's Program on US-Japan Relations, working with Edwin O. Reischauer and Hisashi Owada. A specialist on Japanese trade and industrial policy in his early years, Calder focused on how party politics and socio-economic structure affect functioning of the Japanese political economy. From 1990 to 2003, after receiving tenure at Princeton, Calder directed the university's Program on U.S.-Japan Relations in the Woodrow Wilson School of Public and International Affairs.

Education
Calder received his Ph.D. in Government from Harvard University in 1979, where he worked under the director of Edwin Reischauer. Apart from the Ohira, Arisawa, and Mainichi Asia-Pacific Prizes for his academic work, Calder also received the Academia Prize of the Japan Society of Scholars (2012); the Eagle on the Sun Award of the Japan Chamber of Commerce and Industry (2015); and the Urasenke Tea Culture Prize (2018). The last of these was a special award for his efforts in promoting international tea-culture diplomacy. In 2014, Calder was also awarded the Order of the Rising Sun, Gold Rays with Neck Ribbon, by the Japanese government for his contribution to the development of Japan studies in the United States and the enhancement of trans-Pacific understanding.

Selected publications

Books 
Global Political Cities: Actors and Arenas of Influence in International Affairs (Brookings Institution, 2021)
Super Continent: The Logic of Eurasian Integration (Stanford: Stanford University Press, 2019)
Circles of Compensation: Economic Growth and the Globalization of Japan (Stanford: Stanford University Press, 2018).
Singapore: Smart City, Smart State (Washington, D.C.: Brookings Institution Press, 2016).
Asia in Washington: Exploring the Penumbra of Transnational Power (Washington, D.C.: Brookings Institution Press, 2014).
 The New Continentalism: Energy and Twenty-First Century Eurasian Geopolitics (New Haven: Yale University Press, May 2012).
 The Making of Northeast Asia co-author with Min Ye (Stanford: Stanford University Press, 2010).
 Pacific Alliance: Reviving U.S.-Japan Relations (New Haven: Yale University Press, 2009)
 East Asian Multilateralism: Prospects for Regional Stability, co-editor with Francis Fukuyama (Baltimore: Johns Hopkins University Press, 2008)
 Korea's Energy Insecurities: Comparative and Regional Perspectives (Washington DC: Korea Economic Institute of America, 2005).
 Embattled Garrisons: Comparative Base Politics and American Globalism (Princeton: Princeton University Press, 2007).
 Pacific Defense: Arms, Energy, and America's Future in Asia (New Haven:Yale University Press, 1996).
 Strategic Capitalism: Private Business and Public Purpose in Japanese Industrial Finance (Princeton, New Jersey: Princeton University Press, 1993).
 Crisis and Compensation: Public Policy and Political Stability in Japan, 1949-1986 (Princeton, New Jersey: Princeton University Press, 1988).
 The Eastasia Edge, co-author with Roy Hofheinz (New York: Basic Books, 1982).

Articles 

 The global logic of a Tokyo-Tehran tête-à-tête
Energy is the key to 21st century Eurasian geopolitics
 Japan's Energy Angst and the Caspian Great Game
 Letter From Tokyo: New Regime, New Relationship? A New Era in U.S.-Japanese Relations
 China and Japan's Simmering Rivalry
 The New Face of Northeast Asia
 Asia's Empty Tank
 Review: Japanese Foreign Economic Policy Formation: Explaining the Reactive State
 Coping with North Korea's Energy Future: KEDO and Beyond
 Resource Development and Arctic Governance: An American Perspective
 U.S. Climate Policy and Prospects for US-Japan Cooperation
 Alliance Endangered? Challenges from the Changing Political-Economic Context of U.S.-Japan Relations
 Beneath the Eagle's Wings? The Political Economy of Northeast Asian Burden-Sharing in Comparative Perspective
 Coping with energy insecurity: China's response in global perspective
 Halfway to Hegemony: Japan's Tortured Trajectory

Selected lectures and interviews
Available online in audio/video with external links:

Beyond Fukushima: Japan's Emerging Energy and Environmental Challenges, April 5, 2012, at Foreign Policy Research Institute, Philadelphia.
 The New Continentalism: Energy and Twenty-First-Century Eurasian Geopolitics, July 5, 2012, at Asan Institute, Seoul, South Korea.
 Dr. Calder: The New Continentalism: Energy and 21st Century Eurasian Geopolitics, September 17, 2012, at Johns Hopkins SAIS, Washington DC.
 The Making of Northeast Asia, at the East West Center, Washington DC.
 Dr. Kent E. Calder on NHK World Wave, December 19, 2011
 Public Lecture: Kent Calder Book Talk: The Making of Northeast Asia
 Managing Risk and Security in East Asia
 ケント・カルダー　ジョンズ・ホプキンス大学高等国際問題研究大学院, June 14, 2013, at Japan National Press Club,
 ケント・カルダー_5_日本経済再生の処方せんは, interviewed by Japanese media NHK on December 17, 2012.
 シリーズ「日米中」①ケント・カルダー氏　October 19, 2009 at Japan National Press Club

References 

American political scientists
American Japanologists
Johns Hopkins University faculty
Princeton University faculty
Harvard University faculty
Harvard Graduate School of Arts and Sciences alumni
Recipients of the Order of the Rising Sun, 3rd class
1948 births
Living people
People from Utah